Dale County School District, also known as Dale County Board of Education (DCBE), is a school district in Dale County, Alabama. It is headquartered in Ozark.

Most areas in the county are zoned to Dale County School District. However four municipalities have their own school districts: Daleville City School District, Dothan City School District, Enterprise City School District, and Ozark City School District. Additionally residents of Fort Rucker are assigned to schools operated by the Department of Defense Education Activity (DoDEA), for elementary levels, while on-post Fort Rucker families may attend Daleville, Enterprise, or Ozark schools at the secondary level.

Schools
 Dale County High School
 George W. Long High School
 Ariton School
 South Dale Middle School
 George W. Long Elementary School
 Midland City Elementary School
 Newton Elementary School

References

External links
 

School districts in Alabama
Education in Dale County, Alabama